Kohan-e Sabz or Kohansabz may refer to:
Kohan-e Sabz, Shahr-e Babak